Kibish River is a river of southern Ethiopia, which defines part of that country's border with South Sudan and Kenya. It flows towards Lake Turkana, although some years it does not have enough volume to reach it, as C.W. Gwynn discovered in 1908.

See also 
Omo Kibish
Rivers of Ethiopia

References 

Rivers of Ethiopia
Ethiopia–South Sudan border
Rivers of South Sudan
Tributaries of Lake Turkana
Border rivers